Gaunless Viaduct, also known as the Lands Viaduct, was a railway viaduct in County Durham. It was designed by Thomas Bouch to carry the South Durham and Lancashire Union Railway between Bishop Auckland and Barnard Castle over the River Gaunless at Lands, also crossing the Haggerleases branch of the railway to Butterknowle.

Bouch designed the viaduct in 1862 and it was built as four lattice truss spans supported on diagonally staggered, paired circular brick piers. It opened on 1 August 1863, at a cost of £15,422.

The viaduct was built for double track widths, although only a single line was laid at first. In 1899 work began to lay this second line, but it was found that the ironwork of the trusses was so badly decayed that they needed to be replaced. This work took until at least 1903. Several photographs exist showing the bridge at this time, still operating but with the spans supported by substantial timber shoring beneath them.

Demolition 

British Railways closed both railways as part of the general decline in local railways of the 1950s and the viaduct was demolished a little over a hundred years after its opening. These closures pre-dated the Beeching Axe.

The coal workings of Cockfield Fell on the Butterknowle branch beneath (the Haggerleases branch had been known by this name since 1899) became exhausted. Low Butterknowle pit closed in 1956, Gordon House Colliery in 1961 and Cockfield Drift in 1962. The branch railway closed shortly after, on 30 September 1963.

After gradual closure of the intervening stations in the late 1950s, both passenger and goods services between Bishop Auckland and Barnard Castle, across the viaduct, were withdrawn in June 1962. Two years after closure, the truss girders were removed for scrap. In 1966, two of the brick piers were toppled by explosives, but left on site.

References 

Railway viaducts in County Durham
Demolished bridges in England
Lattice truss bridges
South Durham and Lancashire Union Railway
Thomas Bouch
River Gaunless
Buildings and structures demolished in 1964